The Spīn Ghar  or Safēd Kōh (less used in this area) meaning both White Mountains, or sometimes (Urdu: Selseleh-ye Safīd Kūh) meaning White Mountain range, is a mountain range to the south of the Hindu Kush. It ranges from eastern Afghanistan into Khyber Pakhtunkhwa, Pakistan, and forms a natural border between the two areas. The lower hills are mostly barren and treeless, but pine grows on the main mountains that form the East Afghan montane conifer forests.

Geography

The range extends from the Peshawar valley in the east about 160 kilometers west to the Logar valley in Afghanistan. The Kabul River cuts a narrow trough through the Spīn Ghar mountains to flow eastward into the Indus River. The range connects directly with the Shandur Top offshoot of the Hindu Kush mountain system.

The highest peak is Mount Sikaram (Sikaram Sar), near the Pakistani town of Parachinar in the Kurram Valley. From here it passes to Tari Mangal, Pewar, Alizai, Khewas, Shilawzan, Luqman Khel, Maikay, Chappri Rest House, Zeran, and Upper Khyber Agency. The Spīn Ghar form the watershed between the river systems of the Kabul and Kurram.

The closest cities to the Spīn Ghar are Jalalabad to the north; Gardez to the west; and Khost, and Parachinar in Pakistan to the south.  

The range between Herat in the west and Chaghcharan in the east is called Paropamisus Mountains.

Geology
The White Mountains are part of the western rim that separates the Indian subcontinent from the Eurasian plate.

The base of the mountains consists of Proterozoic gneisses and granites with admixtures of gabbros, mafic metavolcanic rocks, marble and migmatites. In the summit there are cirque glaciers, some of which are filled with scree.

On the southern flank of the Sikaram Sar follow from 2500 m from bottom to top: alluvial soils in valleys, limestone and dolomite up to 4000 m, an intermediate zone of slate at 4000 m, above crystalline rock.

Fauna
A 20,000 hectare biotope in the southwest of Spīn Ghar is listed as an important bird area in Afghanistan.

Agriculture and forestry
Above the nearly barren lower slopes, forests of pine and deodar cedar thrived on the main range, but devastation during the Afghan civil wars reduced timber resources. The valleys still support some agriculture.

The rivers of the White Mountains serve the irrigation of the fields in the densely populated river valleys, which allows the pelvis of Jalalabad multiple harvests. Wheat, maize, various types of vegetables (onions, green beans, okra, tomatoes, etc.), cotton, opium poppies are grown, and lemons, sugar cane and olives are also grown around Jalalabad. The Bara high valley in the southeast of the range is one of the most intensively used agricultural areas of the Pakistani tribal areas under Khyber Pakhtunkhwa.

Older reports speak of rich orchards in the valleys of Spīn Ghar with mulberry and pomegranate trees.

Wood from the eastern Afghan forests has been exported mainly to Pakistan since the 19th century, and in increasingly irresponsible quantities, so that Afghanistan imposed a complete export ban in 1975, which smugglers circumvented. In addition to the actual forestry there is or was a collection economy for pistachio nuts and the edible seeds of Pinus gerardiana.

Passes

There are a few notable mountain passes in or near the Spīn Ghar mountain range. The famous Khyber Pass crosses a spur of the Spīn Ghar. A second crossing, near Mount Sikaram, is called Peiwar Pass or Gawi Pass and connects Parachinar city on the Pakistani side with the Aryob Valley of Paktia Province, Afghanistan. The most viable route over the main ridge of the White Mountains is the Agam Pass (3586 m), over which the distance from Jalalabad to Parachinar is 92 km.

History
The Durand Line border formed in 1893 between Afghanistan and British India cuts through these mountains.

According to US military intelligence, many al-Qaeda fighters, including Osama Bin Laden, crossed the Spīn Ghar to escape to Pakistan during the Tora Bora offensive in 2001. Bin Laden hid in the sparsely vegetated mountains in the northern part, called Tora Bora. After 2004, the Spīn Ghar mountain range was a pivotal place and theater of many battles fought between the foreign fighters of al-Qaeda and the joint Northern Command of the Pakistani military, with the latter trying to prevent the foreign fighters' incursion into Pakistan.

See also
 List of mountain ranges of the world
 List of highest mountains (a list of mountains above 7,200m)
 Environmental issues in Afghanistan
 Durand Line
 Koh-i-Baba

External links

References

Mountain ranges of Afghanistan
Insurgency in Khyber Pakhtunkhwa
Mountain ranges of Khyber Pakhtunkhwa
Landforms of Paktia Province
Mountain ranges of Pakistan
Nangarhar Province
Logar Province
Paktia Province
Khyber Pakhtunkhwa